Locwood is an MTR  stop. It is located at ground level at Tin Shui Road, between Locwood Court and Sherwood Court of Kingswood Villas, in Tin Shui Wai, Yuen Long District. It began service on 10 January 1993 and belongs to Zone 4.

History
The stop was planned to be named "Kingswood" before Light Rail Tin Shui Wai Branch started operations in 1993. However, to consider other stops in individual areas of Kingswood Villas afterwards, its name was finalized to "Locwood" when Tin Shui Wai Branch operated.

References

MTR Light Rail stops
Former Kowloon–Canton Railway stations
Tin Shui Wai
Railway stations in Hong Kong opened in 1993
MTR Light Rail stops named from housing estates